This is a list of the mountains of the Alps, ordered by their topographic prominence. For a list by height, see the list of mountains of the Alps. By descending to 1,500 m of prominence, this list includes all the Ultras of the Alps.  Some famous peaks, such as the Matterhorn and Eiger, are not Ultras because they are connected to higher mountains by high cols and therefore do not achieve enough topographic prominence.

Where the prominence parent and the island parent differ, the prominence parent is marked with "1" and the island parent with "2" (with Mont Blanc abbreviated to MB). The column "Col height" denotes the lowest elevation to which one must descend from a peak in order to reach peaks with higher elevations; note that the elevation of any peak is the sum of its prominence and col. The column "Col location" denotes the pass where the col height is located.

See also

Worldwide list of peaks ranked by prominence
List of mountains of Switzerland (with height and prominence ranking)
List of peaks in the British Isles ranked by prominence
List of European ultra-prominent peaks
List of the highest European ultra-prominent peaks

References

Petter Bjørstad, Jonathan de Ferranti, Eberhard Jurgalski, Vasja Kavcic and Aaron Maizlish, Lists and maps covering all peaks in Europe with 1500m+ prominence (2004), The Ultras Project (peaklist.org).
Ultras of the Alps in the Peakbagger database
Eberhard Jurgalski, the complete table of summits in the Alps separated by 590 metres of re-ascent (2004-2005, 2008).
Richard Goedeke: Giganten der Alpen: Die 20 prominentesten Berge der Alpen. Bruckmann Verlag, 2006, .

Prominence
Alpine peaks by prominence